The San Remo Oil Agreement was an agreement between Britain and France  signed at the San Remo conference on 24 April 1920. As a result of the agreement, the French Compagnie Française de Petroles (CFP)
acquired a 25% share in the  Turkish Petroleum Company (TPC). The other shareholders were the Anglo-Persian Oil Company (APOC) with 47.5%, the Anglo Saxon Petroleum Co 22.5% and the remaining 5% Calouste Gulbenkian.

Background
On 19 March 1914, the British and German governments had signed an agreement whereby the interest of National Bank of Turkey in TPC was transferred to APOC. The newly reconstituted TPC then applied for a concession for Mesopotamian oil which was granted subject to various conditions at which point World War I intervened. In December 1918, the British expropriated the 25% share of Deutsche Bank in TPC.

It was this latter share that was ultimately to be given to the French under the San Remo oil agreement. There were prior abortive attempts at an agreement, preliminary and then final version of the Long-Bérenger Agreement, then the Greenwood-Bérenger Agreement before the final San Remo version. All versions can be seen at.
 
The agreement delimited the oil interests in Russia and Romania, British (British Mandate of Mesopotamia) and French colonies. The initial agreement takes the names of the British petroleum minister, Sir Walter Long, and the French petroleum minister, Henri Bérenger, who negotiated the agreement.

See also
Partitioning of the Ottoman Empire

Notes

References

France–United Kingdom treaties
1919 in France
1919 in the United Kingdom
Aftermath of World War I in France
Treaties concluded in 1919
Treaties of the United Kingdom (1801–1922)
Treaties of the French Third Republic
Energy treaties
Petroleum politics
Aftermath of World War I in the United Kingdom
April 1919 events